The Indian Skill Development Services or 'ISDS'  is one of the gazetted Central Civil Services (technical) under Group 'A' of the executive branch of the Government of India. It's is newest Central service. This service is created for training directorate of Ministry of Skill Development and Entrepreneurship.

The appointment to this service is done through Combined Engineering Services Exam held every year by Union Public Service Commission (UPSC) of India.

It has 263 all India posts, the cadre comprises 3 post at senior administrative grade while 28 are at junior grade. While 120 posts at Senior Time Scale and 112 posts at Junior Time Scale.

Generally they are inducted through training at Administrative Training Institute, Mysuru. The first batch was inducted in 2019.

See also 
 Entrepreneurship
 National Skill Development Corporation
 List of Indian entrepreneurs

References 

Ministry of Skill Development and Entrepreneurship